Wen Wu Ding or Wen Ding or Tai Ding(太丁), personal name Zi Tuo, was a king of the Shang dynasty of Ancient China. His reign was from 1116 to 1106 BC.

Records 
According to Bamboo Annals, his capital was moved from Mou(沬) to Yin (殷).

In the second year of his reign, his vassal Jili(季歷) of Zhou attacked the Yanjing Rong, but they defeated him.

During his third year, the Huan River dried up.

In his fourth year, Jili attacked the Yuwu Rong and was victorious, making Yuwu into a Zhou client.

In his seventh year, Jili attacked the ShiHu Rong and was again victorious.

Several years later, Jili defeated the Xitu Rong and captured three of their generals. Worried that Zhou was growing too powerful, Wen Ding sent Jili to a rural store house and had him starved to death there.

References

Shang dynasty kings
12th-century BC Chinese monarchs
1100s BC deaths